Anuta is a small high island in the southeastern part of the Solomon Islands province of Temotu, one of the smallest permanently inhabited Polynesian islands. It is one of the Polynesian Outlier communities in Melanesia.

Geography

It is a small volcanic island with a fringing coral reef.

The island lies halfway between the Solomon Islands archipelago and Tuvalu. Anuta's nearest populated neighbour is Tikopia Island, about 112 kilometres to the southwest. The next closest islands are Vanikolo, Utupua, and the Reef Islands—with mixed Melanesian and Polynesian populations—and the Duff Islands, all over 320 kilometres away. Further southwest lie the Banks and New Hebrides Groups.

History
Anuta was first mentioned in 1791, and the political and geographical circumstances led to isolation of Anuta's population.

According to oral traditions, Anuta was settled by voyagers from Tonga and 'Uvea about fifteen generations ago. The time frame of the migration is not precisely identified but is understood to be some time between the 10th century and the mid-13th century, although the arrival of the voyagers in Anuta could have occurred later. The pattern of settlement that is believed to have occurred is that the Polynesians spread out from Tonga and other islands in the central and southeastern Pacific islands. During pre-European-contact times, there was frequent canoe voyaging between the islands, because Polynesian navigation skills are recognised to have allowed deliberate journeys on double-hull sailing canoes or outrigger canoes. The voyagers moved into the Tuvaluan atolls, with Tuvalu providing a stepping-stone to migration into the Polynesian Outlier communities in Melanesia and Micronesia.

One of the Tongan settlers, Pu Kaurave, became the first chief, and was succeeded by his son Ruokimata. When Ruokimata died without an heir, Taroaki, one of the 'Uvean arrivals, became the next chief. Further arrivals from Samoa and Tonga occurred two generations after the initial settlers. The current social structure was established in the sixth generation when chief Tearakura, his two brothers, and one brother-in-law slew the remainder of the island's male population. These men, along with Tearakura's two sisters, were founders of the island's four kainanga, large descent groups that are sometimes described in English as 'clans'. Another group arrived from Rotuma some time later.

Anglican missionaries arrived in 1916, quickly converting the entire island. During the 1990s, Anuta's advisers rejected western medicines on the island, arguing that it would indicate a lack of faith in the church. Administratively, Anuta is part of the Anglican Church of Melanesia Diocese of Temotu.

In December 2002, the island was impacted by Cyclone Zoe.

Society and culture
Anuta has a human population of about 300. This is one of the highest population densities in the world, perhaps equalling that of Bangladesh.

The island has two systems for naming villages (noporanga, or "dwelling places"). In one system there are three villages called Mua, Muri, and St. John. Mua, meaning "front", is to the east. Muri, meaning "back" is west of Mua. After establishment of the Anglican church in 1916, a third village grew up to the west of Muri and took the name of the church, St. John. In the second system, Mua and Muri are combined under the name, Rotoapi, and contrasted with the new village which, in the second system, is called Vatiana.

Language
Anutans speak the Anuta language (locally te taranga paka-Anuta), which is related to other Polynesian languages.

Relationship with environment
An important value in Anutan society is aropa, which emphasizes collaboration, sharing and compassion for others. The concept of aropa encourages islanders to share their finite resources equitably. Because Anuta's high population density has not had a severely negative impact on the island's ecosystem, Anuta has attracted interest from scientists interested in sustainability. The BBC documentary series South Pacific devotes part of Episode 2 (Castaways) to the ability of Anutans to maintain their island's bounty, contrasting it with the environmental destruction found on Easter Island.

The Anuta tribe takes care to fulfil their needs with respect to the environment, to preserve it. At certain times they do not catch certain fish or hunt animals.

Social life 
Like most of the other Polynesian islands, Anuta has traditions of choral polyphonic singing. Free time is spent dancing, singing and swimming.

Research and media exposure
Anthropologist Raymond Firth visited Anuta for a day in 1952.  Ethnobotanist Douglas Yen, along with archaeologists Patrick Kirch and Paul Rosendahl, spent about two months there in 1971, and anthropologist Richard Feinberg lived on Anuta for almost a year in 1972–1973.  He has remained in communication with the Anutan community from that time onward and has made several additional visits.

Five documentaries about Anuta have been created. In January 2005 Italian documentarists Elisabetta (Lizzi) Eordegh and Carlo Auriemma sailed aboard the sailing boat "Barca Pulita" with a crew of four (including two doctors) and visited the island for one week. In 2006, Bruce Parry of the BBC visited for several weeks, during which he and his team filmed an episode of the TV show, Tribe. In 2008, another film team from the BBC made a brief visit, and in 2012 a team from the Seoul Broadcasting System filmed a TV show there for a Korean audience. In 2013, the team and crew of the Canadian documentary 1000 jours pour la planète arrived on the island with the anthropologist Richard Feinberg.

See also
Austronesian peoples
Pacific Islands
Polynesia
Polynesian outlier
Solomon Islands

References

Further reading
 Feinberg, Richard. 1977. The Anutan Language Reconsidered: Lexicon and Grammar of a Polynesian Outlier.  Two Volumes.  HRAFlex Books.  New Haven: Human Relations Area Files Press.
 Feinberg, Richard. "Back to Anuta."
 Feinberg, Richard.  1980.  History and Structure: A Case of Polynesian Dualism. Journal of Anthropological Research 36(3):361–378.
 Feinberg, Richard. 1988. Polynesian Seafaring and Navigation: Ocean Travel in Anutan Culture and Society.  Kent, Ohio: Kent State University Press.
 Feinberg, Richard. 1986. "The 'Anuta Problem': Local Sovereignty and National Integration in the Solomon Islands" Man 21(3):438–452.
 Feinberg, Richard. 1998. Oral Traditions of Anuta: A Polynesian Outlier in the Solomon Islands Oxford Studies in Anthropological Linguistics, Volume 15.  New York and Oxford: Oxford University Press.
 Feinberg, Richard. 2012. Anuta: Polynesian Lifeways for the 21st Century.  Kent, OH: Kent State University Press.
 Feinberg, Richard. 1996. "Outer Islanders and Urban Resettlement in the Salomon Islands: The Case of Anutans on Guadalcanal." Journal de la Société des Océanistes. Issue 103, p. 207-217.
 Firth, Raymond. 1954.	Anuta and Tikopia: symbiotic elements in social organization  Journal of the Polynesian Society 63:87 131.
 Yen, D. E. and Janet Gordon, eds. 1973. Anuta: A Polynesian Outlier in the Solomon Islands.  Pacific Anthropological Records, Number 21.  Honolulu: Bernice P. Bishop Museum Press.

External links
 Language: Anuta, Basic Vocabulary Database
 Anuta community fishing, BBC video

Islands of the Solomon Islands
Polynesian outliers
Tribes of Oceania
Volcanoes of the Solomon Islands